KDKN (106.7 FM) is a radio station broadcasting an alternative rock format. Licensed to Ellington, Missouri, United States, the station is currently owned by Fred Dockins, through licensee Dockins Communications, Inc.

References

External links

Radio stations in Missouri
Alternative rock radio stations in the United States